Bishnu Dey (18 July 1909 – 3 December 1982) was a Bengali poet, writer and academician in the era of modernism, post-modernism, who hailed from Pantihal village. Starting off as a symbologist, he won recognition for the musical quality of his poems, and forms the post-Tagore generation of Bengali poets, like Buddhadeb Basu and Samar Sen, which marked the advent of "New Poetry" in Bengali literature, deeply influenced by Marxist ideology. He published a magazine wherein he encouraged socially conscious writing. His own work reveals a poet's solitary struggle, quest for human dignity, amidst a crisis of uprooted identity. Through his literary career, he taught English literature at various institutes with various capacities such as lecturer at Krishnagar College (1934–40) and Surendranath College (1940–44), Reader at Presidency University (1944–1947), Professor at Maulana Azad College (1947–1969). also remained a member of a young group of poets, centered on the Kallol (Commotion) magazine.

His most important work, Smriti Satta Bhabishyat (Memory, being, the Future) (1955–61), set a new precedent in Bengali poetry. It later won him the 1965 Sahitya Akademi Award in Bengali as well as the highest literary award of India, Jnanpith Award, in 1971.

Biography
Bishnu Dey was born in 1909 in the area of College Square in Calcutta. His poetic skills flourished in the stagnating time after WW1. He came from a well-educated, affluent family and his father was an attorney, from Pantihal village. He was allowed to buy as many books as he wanted making him a prolific reader.

In 1930 he started studying at St. Pauls College and a new phase of his life began. His professors influenced him in powerful ways exposing him to Western Classical Music. It was the key to his poetic form and content. His son Jishnu Dey fondly remembers their time in Rikhia where they would take his hand winding gramophone with his 78 RPM records of Bach, Beethoven and Mozart.

Rikhia, Jharkhand- the land of the ancient Santhal Praganas was a special place for Bishnu Dey where he tried his hand at landscape painting. As a poet beauty was the inexhaustible truth and composing a river for Bishnu Dey.

A new revelation came to his life as he read TS Eliot's poems that revolved around the crisis of capitalist culture in Europe after WW1. In the 1930s, BD came out of Rabindranath's shadow, towards progressive poetry writing along with other Bengali poets. But he didn't pride himself against Rabindranath as he understood the importance of traditions in a progressive world of poetry writers.

In the 1930s, Rabindranath carved out a niche for himself as he began painting which revealed his inner soul. His exhibition of paintings created a stir in Paris in 1931. Shudhindranath Dutta published a journal 'Purichoy' and Bishnu Dey associated with it. He was greatly influenced by Jamini Roy at this point. His first book of poems came out in 1933 for which he received letters of appreciation from RT.

From 1932 to 1934, he pursued his Post Graduation at Calcutta University where his musical tastes were greatly influenced by Jyotinindra Moitro. He married his classmate Pronoti Roy Choudhury on Dec 2, 1934.

In 1935 he joined Rippon College as a professor of literature where began 'Kobita', a quarterly magazine. The same year his first daughter Ruchira was born. In 1937 he came out with his second book of poems titled 'Chorabali'. In 1938 his second daughter Uttara was born.

In 1939 World War II commenced and Bishnu Dey was inspired by world history. His roots in Marxism strengthened; it was his own interpretation of Marxism in art and literature. On June 22, 1941, 'Friends of Soviet Committee' was formed and Dey joined it.

On August 7, 1941, Rabindranath Tagore died. That coincided with Bishnu Dey's third book of poems 'Burbolekho'. Jamini Roy illustrated the cover. The poems were dedicated to Rabindranath Tagore. Bishnu Dey's bond with Marxism reoriented the understanding of the poet Rabindranath Tagore, at the same time Jamini Roy had come into his life in a very big way.

The modernity of Bengali poets in the 1930s distanced themselves from Rabindranath's poetry and came under the influence of contemporary western poetry, advances in science and philosophy.

Times were progressing and Charles Darwin came out with the theory of evolution. James George Frazer contributed a new angle to anthropology. Along with all these discoveries Bishnu Dey assimilated cultural wealth consisting of music, painting sculpture and architecture. He created a bridge between Greek mythology and the Eastern Pantheon. 'Shathbai chumpa' was a poetry book written in the background of war and famine.

On March 8, 1942, an anti-fascist demonstration occurred in Dhaka and a progressive writer Shomin Chandu was killed. Bishnu Dey was there for the protest meeting in Calcutta. An Anti-Fascist Writers and Artist Organization was formed on March 28, 1942, and Dey became the secretary requesting other Bengali artists and poets to join in the movement.

The communists under the leadership of PC Joshi gave leadership to the movement combining the two streams of thought of communism and Marxism. Bishnu Dey was closely related to the Indian Peoples Theatre Association (IPTA), which played a significant role at this time. Artist Paritosh Sen fondly remembers that it was art that brought them together. In 1943 during the Bengal Famine some simultaneous historic movements occurred like Quit India Movement and the Azad Hind Force set foot into Manipur. This created a new sense of purpose and meaning in the artists' works. After several long discussions the artists concluded that The Bengal School doesn't resonate with the occurrences of the current times. Therefore, they looked at tribal and European art as modes of inspiration and took on an individual approach. At this point The Calcutta Artist's Group was formed consisting of Gopal Ghosh, Prodosh Das Gupta, Nirod Majumdar, Prankrishna Pal, Shubho Thakur and Paritosh Sen himself. Bishnu Dey encouraged the Calcutta Group, attended their meetings and wrote about them. Jamini Roy was a good friend.

In 1946 the 'Tebhaga Movement' rocked Bengal and the peasant conference influenced Dey. He came out with 'Shom De Pichor'. In 1944, Bishnu Dey joined Islamia College which later was known as Moulana Azad College. In 1945, Dey went to Rikhia for the first time. It was a place of solitude, inspiration and was closely woven with his life. He tried landscape painting but did not continue for long. Paritosh Sen got an opportunity to live and experience Bishnu Dey's varied interests in Classical Western and Indian music when he stayed with him and his wife Pronoti in Rikhia, at their house.

On the one hand was human alienation, class struggle, caused by capitalism and the resistance to it and on the other side was Dey's joyous response to the singing of Maluti Ghoshal, Jyotinindro Moitro, Rajayshwari Dutto, Debobrotto Biswas. Bishnu Dey got his poems translated in Santhal and other Chhattisgarh languages through poet Verrier Elwin. This showed his deep attachment to his motherland.

In 1971, he received the Gandhi Award for his book 'Smriti Satya Bhavishyat'. Rabindranath Tagore was a big influence on Bishnu Dey. Dey wrote the tragic poem 'Damini' by starting it with the words of the heroine in Rabindranath's novel 'Chotrongo'.

A reporter Shomo Sen wrote after Bishnu Dey died in 1982, "An internationalist, Bishnu Dey never went abroad, declining numerous invitations and allurements and one never saw him in western clothes, a near perfect Bengali in manner, his knowledge of the world was enviable".

Education and Career
Bishnu Dey studied at Mitra Institution, Calcutta and Sanskrit Collegiate School, Calcutta. After matriculating in 1927, he went on to do his IA from Bangabashi College, Calcutta. He completed his BA (Hons.) in English from St. Paul's Cathedral Mission College, Calcutta and MA in English from the University of Calcutta.

In 1935, he joined Ripon College, Calcutta. He subsequently taught at Presidency College, Kolkata (1944–1947), Maulana Azad College, Calcutta (1947–1969). In 1935, he joined Ripon College, Calcutta. He subsequently taught at Presidency College, Kolkata (1944–1947), Maulana Azad College, Calcutta (1947–1969).

Writings
Urvashi O Artemis (1932)
Chora Bali (1938)
Purba Lekh (1940)
Sandiper Char (1947)
Annishta (1950)
Naam Rekhechi Komal Gandhar (1950)
The Paintings of Rabindranath Tagore (1958)
India and Modern Art (1959)
Art of Jamini Roy (1988)
Chhadano Ei Jiban (This Scattered Life)
Sahityer Bhabishyat(1952) 

Some regard his poems as intricate and incomprehensible to a great extent, most likely due to wide use of references and imageries from literary works and cultural instances of foreign origin.

Ideology
He was inspired by Marxist philosophy and by the ideas and style of T. S. Eliot. Post-partition along with other Calcutta-based writers and poets like Subhash Mukhopadhyay he formed the "Anti-Fascist Writers' and Artists' Association" in 1947.

Accolades
Sahitya Akademi Award (1966)
Nehru Smriti Award (1967)
Rastriya Jnanpith Award (1971)
Soviet Land Award for Rushti Panchashati.

References

External links 
  
 

1909 births
1982 deaths
Bengali male poets
Indian male poets
Bangabasi College alumni
Academic staff of Presidency University, Kolkata
Recipients of the Sahitya Akademi Award in Bengali
Recipients of the Jnanpith Award
St. Paul's Cathedral Mission College alumni
University of Calcutta alumni
Academic staff of the University of Calcutta
Indian literary critics
20th-century Indian poets
Poets from West Bengal
Writers from Kolkata
20th-century Indian male writers